Howard Gereo (born 18 April 1978) is a Papua New Guinean boxer. He competed in the men's flyweight event at the 1996 Summer Olympics. He also won a gold medal at the 1997 Arafura Games.

References

External links
 

1978 births
Living people
Flyweight boxers
Papua New Guinean male boxers
Olympic boxers of Papua New Guinea
Boxers at the 1996 Summer Olympics
Place of birth missing (living people)